Egglestonichthys is a genus of gobies native to brackish and marine waters of the Indian Ocean and the western Pacific Ocean.

Species
These are the currently recognized species in this genus:
 Egglestonichthys bombylios  (Egglestone's bumblebee goby)
Egglestonichthys fulmen 
 Egglestonichthys melanoptera 
 Egglestonichthys patriciae 
 Egglestonichthys rubidus G. R. Allen, Erdmann & William M. Brooks, 2020
 Egglestonichthys ulbubunitj

References

Gobiidae